Abilio Estévez is a Cuban novelist, playwright and poet. He was born in Havana in 1954. He lives in Barcelona.

Selected works
 El horizonte y otros regresos
 Tuyo es el reino
 Los palacios distantes 
 Ceremonias para actores desesperados 
 Inventario secreto de la Habana

References

Cuban male novelists
People from Havana
People from Barcelona
1954 births
Living people
University of Havana alumni
Date of birth missing (living people)